The Rudolf Hotel in Valley City, North Dakota is a three-story hotel building that was built in 1907.  It was designed by John W. Ross in Classical Revival style.  It was listed on the National Register of Historic Places in 1983.

Its significance recognized in the listing was for its association with Rudolph Giselius (1872-1944), for its example of work by North Dakota architect John W. Ross (1848–1914), for it being the oldest hotel in Valley City, and for its role in the local business and social community through the years.  At the listing date in 1983, it had been vacant since 1977.

Its basement was site of Kiwanis Club meetings, and the first meeting of the North Dakota Aberdeen-Angus Breeders Association (in 1942).

It has since been converted to senior-living apartments, named Rudolf Square.

References

Neoclassical architecture in North Dakota
Hotel buildings completed in 1907
Hotel buildings on the National Register of Historic Places in North Dakota
National Register of Historic Places in Barnes County, North Dakota
1907 establishments in North Dakota